20th Century Masters – The Millennium Collection: The Best of Whitesnake is a compilation of Whitesnake's biggest hits from the 1980s. It features hit singles from their albums Slide It In, Whitesnake and Slip of the Tongue. The compilation was certified Gold by RIAA in the US and charted at number 50 on the Billboard Top Catalog Albums chart.

Track listing

Charts

Album

Certifications

References

Whitesnake compilation albums
2000 greatest hits albums
Geffen Records compilation albums
Whitesnake